Robert Sinclair may refer to:

Politics
Sir Robert Sinclair, 1st Baronet, of Longformacus (died 1678), MP of Scotland for Berwickshire
Sir Robert Sinclair, 3rd Baronet, of Longformacus (died 1727), MP of Scotland for Berwickshire
Sir Robert Sinclair, 3rd Baronet, of Stevenston (1643–1713), MP of Scotland for Haddingtonshire
Robert Sinclair, 1st Baron Sinclair of Cleeve (1893–1979), British businessman and public servant

Sports
 Rob Sinclair (footballer, born 1974), for Maidstone United
 Rob Sinclair (footballer, born 1989), English footballer for Forest Green Rovers
 Bobby Sinclair (1915–1993), Scottish footballer for Falkirk and Darlington

Other
 Robert Sinclair (bishop) (died 1398), bishop of Orkney and bishop of Dunkeld
 Robert Sinclair (locomotive engineer) (1817–1898), chief mechanical engineer of the Caledonian Railway
 Robert B. Sinclair (1905-1970), film and theater director
 Robert J. Sinclair (1932–2009), American automotive industry executive
 Sir Robert Sinclair, 9th Baronet (1820–1899)

See also
 Bob Sinclar (born 1969), French record producer and DJ
 Bob St. Clair (1931–2015), American football player
 Sinclair (surname)